There are a number of elementary schools named Madison Elementary School. Here is a list of schools that use the name.

In real life
 Madison Elementary School (Davenport, Iowa), NRHP-nominated and possibly NRHP-listed
 Madison Elementary School (Fargo, North Dakota)
 Madison Elementary School (Madison, Alabama)
 Madison Elementary School (Norman, Oklahoma)
 Madison Elementary School (Ogden, Utah)
 Madison Elementary School (Pittsburgh, Pennsylvania), a Pittsburgh Landmark
 Madison Elementary School (Santa Ana, California)
 Madison Elementary School (Skokie, Illinois)
 Madison Elementary School (West Allis, Wisconsin)
 Madison Elementary School (Winona, Minnesota)
 Madison Elementary School (Blaine, Minnesota)

Fiction
 An elementary school that appears on Cartoon Network's Ben 10 original series.